The 2023 U Sports/Curling Canada University Championships were held from March 15 to 19 at the Gerry McCrory Countryside Sports Complex in Sudbury, Ontario. The host university of the event was Laurentian University. Sudbury was originally scheduled to host the 2022 edition of the event, however, it was cancelled due to the COVID-19 pandemic in Ontario. The event was held in conjunction with the 2023 CCAA/Curling Canada College Curling Championships, the Canadian college curling championship.

On the men's side, the Wilfrid Laurier Golden Hawks defended their title with a 9–7 victory over the Dalhousie Tigers in the championship game. The team, skipped by Sam Mooibroek, finished the round robin in first place with a 6–1 record. They then defeated Queen's Golden Gaels 12–10 in the semifinal to qualify for the championship game. The Dalhousie Tigers, led by Adam McEachren, finished second in the round robin with a 5–2 record before stealing their way into the championship game with 5–4 win over the Laurentian Voyageurs. In the bronze medal game, the Queen's Golden Gaels, skipped by Owen Purdy, took one in the tenth end to defeat the Laurentian Voyageurs, led by Jake Horgan.

The women's event also saw a successful title defense with the Alberta Pandas stealing one in the tenth end to defeat the Dalhousie Tigers 5–4. The Alberta team, skipped by Serena Gray-Withers, finished third in the round robin with a 4–3 record. They then eliminated the Memorial Sea-Hawks in the semifinal thanks to a five ender in the eighth, leading to their 7–6 victory. For the Tigers, led by Marin Callaghan, they also went 4–3 through the round robin, however, upset the number one seeded Laurentian Voyageurs 10–6 in the semifinal to earn a spot in the championship game. The Laurentian rink, led by Bella Croisier, bounced back with a 6–5 win over the Memorial Sea-Hawks, skipped by Mackenzie Mitchell, to claim the bronze medal.

Men

Teams
The teams are listed as follows:

Round robin standings
Final Round Robin Standings

Round robin results
All draws are listed in Eastern Time (UTC−04:00).

Draw 2
Wednesday, March 15, 9:30 pm

Draw 4
Thursday, March 16, 12:30 pm

Draw 6
Thursday, March 16, 8:30 pm

Draw 8
Friday, March 17, 12:30 pm

Draw 10
Friday, March 17, 8:30 pm

Draw 11
Saturday, March 18, 8:30 am

Draw 13
Saturday, March 18, 4:30 pm

Playoffs

Semifinals
Sunday, March 19, 9:30 am

Bronze medal game
Sunday, March 19, 2:30 pm

Final
Sunday, March 19, 2:30 pm

Final standings

Women

Teams
The teams are listed as follows:

Round robin standings
Final Round Robin Standings

Round robin results
All draws are listed in Eastern Time (UTC−04:00).

Draw 1
Wednesday, March 15, 5:30 pm

Draw 3
Thursday, March 16, 8:30 am

Draw 5
Thursday, March 16, 4:30 pm

Draw 7
Friday, March 17, 8:30 am

Draw 9
Friday, March 17, 4:30 pm

Draw 12
Saturday, March 18, 12:30 pm

Draw 14
Saturday, March 18, 8:30 pm

Playoffs

Semifinals
Sunday, March 19, 9:30 am

Bronze medal game
Sunday, March 19, 2:30 pm

Final
Sunday, March 19, 2:30 pm

Final standings

References

External links

Curling competitions in Greater Sudbury
March 2023 sports events in Canada
U Sports/Curling Canada Championships
U Sports/Curling Canada Championships